is a Japanese former professional baseball outfielder in Japan's Nippon Professional Baseball. He played for the Hanshin Tigers from 2010 to 2015.

External links

NPB stats

1987 births
Living people
Baseball people from Kanagawa Prefecture
Japanese baseball players
Nippon Professional Baseball outfielders
Hanshin Tigers players